This is a list of electoral results for the Electoral district of Ripon in Victorian state elections. The 2018 result was the subject of a legal challenge by the second placed Labor candidate.

Members for Ripon

Election results

Elections in the 2020s

Note: 2021 redistribution turned this seat to a notional Labor seat with 2.8% margin.

Elections in the 2010s

Note: 2013 redistribution turned this seat to a notional Liberal seat with 1.6% margin.

Elections in the 2000s

Elections in the 1990s

Elections in the 1980s

Elections in the 1970s

Elections in the 1950s

Elections in the 1940s

References

 

Victoria (Australia) state electoral results by district